Griscelli syndrome type 3 is a disorder of melanosome transport presenting initially with hypopigmentation.

See also
Griscelli syndrome

References

External links 

 

Disturbances of human pigmentation
Syndromes